Udo Schmuck (born 29 October 1952) is a German former footballer who played for Dynamo Dresden and won seven caps for East Germany. He is married to the Olympic medal-winning athlete Evelin Kaufer and has two sons, one of whom, Thomas, is also a footballer.

External links

International appearances

1952 births
Living people
German footballers
East German footballers
East Germany international footballers
Dynamo Dresden players
German football managers
East German football managers
Dynamo Dresden managers
Dynamo Dresden non-playing staff
DDR-Oberliga players
VfB Fortuna Chemnitz managers
Association football defenders
FSV Zwickau managers